Micrixalus herrei is a newly redescribed species of frog in the family Micrixalidae. Originally described in 1942, it was synonymized with M. fuscus in 1984. However, morphological differences as well as DNA evidence confirm this species to be valid. It is endemic to the Western Ghats, India, and occurs south of the Shencottah Gap in Kerala and Tamil Nadu states. The common name Kallar dancing frog has been proposed for this species, in reference to Kallar, Trivandrum, its type locality.

Description
Males measure  and females  in snout–vent length. The head is small and flat above with a pointed snout that is rounded in lateral view. The dorsum is reddish orange with irregular, light brown patches. The tympanum and its surroundings are dark grey. The throat, cheast, and belly are greyish white with some greyish yellow reticulation on the belly.

Male Micrixalus herrei have a single vocal sac and a nuptial pad on the first finger. Characteristic for the genus, they display the foot-flagging behaviour. Male-male combats also involve kicking.

Habitat
The natural habitats of this species are fast flowing streams and rivulets in primary and secondary forests. It is relatively abundant where it has been found.

References

herrei
Amphibians described in 1942
Endemic fauna of the Western Ghats
Frogs of India